Wong Chuk Hang Estate was a public housing estate in Staunton Creek, Hong Kong. The estate had ten residential blocks and was cleared in 2007. The estate has been replaced by the MTR Wong Chuk Hang station and Wong Chuk Hang Depot.

Background
Wong Chuk Hang Estate was the only Government Low Cost Housing Estate on Hong Kong Island in the 1960s and the 1970s. It consisted of 10 residential blocks that were developed in 3 phases. Phase 1 (Block 1 and 2), Phase 2 (Block 3 to 6) and Phase 3 (Block 7 to 10) were completed in 1968, 1972 and 1973 respectively. In 1973, the estate was renamed Wong Chuk Hang Estate. In 1985, Block 9 was found to have structural problems by Hong Kong Housing Authority, and was demolished in 1988. In 2007, the whole estate was cleared and most of the tenants were moved to the nearby Shek Pai Wan Estate. The site has been replaced by the MTR Wong Chuk Hang station, one of the railway stations of the South Island line, and a railway depot.

See also
 Wong Chuk Hang station
 Public housing in Hong Kong
 List of public housing estates in Hong Kong

References

Wong Chuk Hang
Former public housing estates in Hong Kong
Residential buildings completed in 1968
Residential buildings completed in 1972
Residential buildings completed in 1973
1968 establishments in Hong Kong
2007 disestablishments in Hong Kong
Buildings and structures demolished in 2007